Lyonetia prunifoliella is a moth in the  family Lyonetiidae.

Distribution
It is found in most of Europe, except Ireland, the Iberian Peninsula, and the Mediterranean islands. It was considered extinct in Great Britain, but has recently been recorded. It is also known from Turkey, Kazakhstan, south-eastern Siberia, the Far East, Japan and North America.

Description
The wingspan is 9–10 mm. Adults are on wing in September, and overwinter, appearing again in the spring.

The larvae feed on Betula pendula, Betula pubescens, Chaenomeles japonica, Cotoneaster integerrimus, Crataegus monogyna, Cydonia oblonga, Mespilus germanica, Prunus armeniaca, Prunus cerasifera, Prunus dulcis, Prunus mahaleb, Prunus persica, Prunus spinosa, Pyrus communis and Sorbus species. They mine the leaves of their host plant. Eggs are deposited in the underside of a leaf. Around the oviposition site a cavity develops, that in the end often leaves a hole in the leaf. Then, the mine becomes a narrow, hardly widening, winding corridor, largely filled with a broad reddish-brown frass line. The corridor then widens into a wide, full depth blotch, often against the leaf margin. The larva may leave its mine and start a new one, sometimes on a different leaf.

Subspecies
 Lyonetia prunifoliella prunifoliella
 Lyonetia prunifoliella malinella (Matsumura, 1907) (Japan)

References

External links

 bladmineerders.nl 
 UKmoths
 Image
 Lyonetiidae of Turkey with notes on their distribution and zoogeography (Lepidoptera)

Lyonetiidae
Moths described in 1796
Moths of Asia
Moths of Europe
Moths of North America
Taxa named by Jacob Hübner